Salman v. United States, 580 U.S. ___ (2016), was a United States Supreme Court case in which the Court held that gifts of confidential information without any compensation to relatives for the purposes of insider trading are a violation of securities laws.

Background
A jury convicted Bassam Yacoub Salman of securities fraud and U.S. District Judge Edward M. Chen then denied Salman's motion for a new trial.  On July 6, 2015, the United States Court of Appeals for the Ninth Circuit affirmed the conviction, in which Judge Jed S. Rakoff was joined by Judges Morgan Christen and Paul J. Watford.

On October 5, 2016, oral arguments were heard, where Deputy Solicitor General Michael Dreeben appeared for the government.

Opinion of the Court 
On December 6, 2016, the Supreme Court delivered judgment in favor of the government, voting unanimously to affirm the lower court. Justice Samuel Alito authored the opinion of the Court.

References

Further reading

External links
 
 SCOTUSblog coverage

United States Supreme Court cases
United States Supreme Court cases of the Roberts Court
2016 in United States case law
United States securities case law
Insider trading